Albert William Strohschein (January 5, 1905 – February 27, 1985) was a provincial politician from Alberta, Canada. He served as a member of the Legislative Assembly of Alberta from 1963 to 1971 sitting with the Social Credit caucus in government.

Political career
Strohschein ran for a seat to the Alberta Legislature in the 1963 Alberta general election as the Social Credit candidate in the electoral district of Wetaskiwin. He won a large majority to hold the seat easily for his party.

Strohschein ran for a second term in the 1967 Alberta general election. He faced a strong challenge from Progressive Conservative candidate Dallas Schmidt but was able to hang on to his seat. He retired from the Assembly at dissolution in 1971.

References

External links
Legislative Assembly of Alberta Members Listing

Alberta Social Credit Party MLAs
1905 births
1985 deaths